Sieradz is a railway station located in the Polish town of Sieradz, in Łódź Voivodeship. It is classified by PKP as a regional station. The station serves mainly regional services between Łódź and Poznań, as well as PKP Intercity trains running between Warsaw and Wrocław. It is also a terminus for ŁKA services running from Łódź Kaliska station.

The station was opened in 1902, along with other stations of the Warsaw-Kalisz Railway. The architectural style of the main building is similar to the stations in Pabianice, Łask and Zduńska Wola. Unlike those, the building is asymmetrical. However, the station is the only existing one between Łódź and Kalisz that still uses mechanical semaphore signals instead of colour light signals used on other stations.

Train services
The station is served by the following services:

 Intercity services (IC) Wrocław Główny — Łódź — Warszawa Wschodnia
Intercity services (IC) Białystok - Warszawa - Łódź - Ostrów Wielkopolski - Wrocław
Intercity services (IC) Ełk - Białystok - Warszawa - Łódź - Ostrów Wielkopolski - Wrocław
 Intercity services (IC) Zgorzelec - Legnica - Wrocław - Ostrów Wielkopolski - Łódź - Warszawa
 InterRegio services (IR) Ostrów Wielkopolski — Łódź — Warszawa Główna
 InterRegio services (IR) Poznań Główny — Ostrów Wielkopolski — Łódź — Warszawa Główna
 Regiona services (PR) Łódź Kaliska — Ostrów Wielkopolski 
 Regional services (PR) Łódź Kaliska — Ostrów Wielkopolski — Poznań Główny

References 

Railway stations in Poland opened in 1902
Railway stations in Łódź Voivodeship
Railway stations served by Łódzka Kolej Aglomeracyjna